Midnite was a roots reggae band from St. Croix, U.S. Virgin Islands, which started playing in 1989.

The band's music follows in tradition with the roots reggae bands of 1970s Jamaica. The lyrical portions of Midnite's compositions are characterized as the "chant and call" style which gives their music a spiritually intense and an overtly Rastafari movement feel. The lyrics are centrally focused on the plights of the oppressed, the inherent faults of the current political, economic and social settings on a global scale, and the redemption available to mankind through a life dedicated to Jah.

In 2015, the band reformed around co-founder Vaughn Benjamin as Akae Beka without bassist Ron Benjamin.  Ras Elyments took Ron Benjamin's position on Bass.  Suren Felton replaced Ras L on keys.  The reasons for the reformation have been stated as due to "life changes, convictions and revelations".  Stated on the band website was "due to a medical emergency the tour is postponed".  Members of the band themselves won't even say during the recent Akae Beka Coronation Tour in November 2015. '.  Akae Beka's first performance took place in Denver, Colorado on July 17, 2015 in honor of Nelson Mandela Day.

History 
The band was started by Benjamin brothers Vaughn (vocals) and Ron (keyboard, but later switched to bass) circa 1989 according to an interview with one of the former Midnite drummer Ambrose "Amby" Connor by Midnight Raver.  Vaughn and Ron invited Joseph Straws, Jr. to be their bassist and Dion "Bosie" Hopkins was the original drummer.  The rhythm section was original as was all of Midnite's music--no covers or already created rhythms.  The brothers were raised in St. Croix, Virgin Islands, the sons of Antiguan musician Ronnie Benjamin, Sr.  Vaughn Benjamin cites Bob Marley, Peter Tosh, Bunny Wailer, The Abyssinians, and bassist Flabba Holt as his earliest influences.

"Bob Marley has had a big impact. And the drum and the bass from like Flabba Holt. Sometimes I listen to the bass man alone or the drummer alone."

The group's debut album Unpolished was released exclusively in Namibia in December 1997.  The album would not see a proper U.S. release until the Rastafaria label released it wide in 2001. They recorded Ras Mek Peace (Before Reverb and Without Delay) while living in Washington, D.C. during the mid-90s, and it was released in November 1999. The album was named so, because it was reportedly recorded live in one room, straight to two-track analog tape. It was mastered without the use of compression or corrective equalization. Ras Mek Peace (Before Reverb and Without Delay) is recorded using no mixing board, no filtering, no compression, no equalization, no noise reduction, multitracking or overdubbing, giving it a raw sound. The album was recorded using only two-tracks at Mapleshade in Upper Marlboro, MD with studio engineer and owner Pierre Sprey whose recording style is  summed up in the phrase he had printed to green Mapleshade T-shirts to promote the studio:  NO Mixing Board, NO Overdubs, NO Noise Reduction, NO Compression, NO Multitracks, NO Reverb, NO EQ, Nothing BUT The Excitement of Live Music, MUSIC WITHOUT COMPROMISE.

Later, they returned home to St. Croix in the late '90s to play with local musicians and record at their music studio, Afrikan Roots Lab.

Midnite frequently collaborates with new artists and has played as the back-up band on a number of Afrikan Roots Lab artists' releases, such as Dezarie's Fya and Gracious Mama Africa and Ikahba's Trodding to Zion.

In September 2011, Midnite released their first professionally produced music video for their song "Mongst I&I". The video features members of the band in casual settings and depicts the Rastafarian culture in Frederiksted, United States Virgin Islands  (referred to as "Freedom City," St. Croix), and Kingston, Jamaica.

Singer Vaughn Benjamin featured on Tribal Seeds' 2014 album Representing.

The band was featured in the 2014 documentary film Escape To St Croix.

Vaughn Benjamin died in Port St. Lucie, Florida, on November 4, 2019, at the age of 50.

Critical acclaim

In its Top 50 Reggae Albums of the 2K list, reggae news and information website Midnight Raver ranked Midnite's Jubilees of Zion as the best album of the new millennium and Beauty for Ashes as the third best. In its review of Akae Beka's Homage to the Land, Midnight Raver referred to Midnite as "the most revered, influential and prolific reggae act in two decades."

Discography
1997 - Unpolished
1999 - Ras Mek Peace
2000 - Jubilees Of Zion
2002 - Seek Knowledge Before Vengeance
2003 - Intense Pressure (dub)
2004 - Scheme A Things
2004 - Ainshant Maps
2008 - Live 94117
2010 - What Makes A King ?
2011 - Anthology
2013 - Lion Out Of Zion

Midnite & I Grade collaboration
2001 - Nemozian Rasta
2002 - Assini
2003 - Vijan
2005 - Let Live
2006 - Jah Grid
2007 - Rule The Time
2011 - Kings Bell
2014 - Beauty For Ashes
2014 - Ride Tru

Midnite & Branch I collaboration
2003 - Cipheraw
2003 - Geoman
2003 - He Is Jah
2004 - Project III

Midnite & Mystic Vision collaboration
2006 - Current
2006 - New 1000

Midnite & Ras L collaboration
2004 - Full Cup
2006 - Thru & True

Midnite & Groundbreaking collaboration
2007 - Aneed

Midnite & Lion Tribe/Fifthson collaboration
2007 - Suns Of Atom
2008 - Standing Ground
2010 - Momentum
2011 - Standing Ground Dub
2012 - In Awe
2013 - Be Strong

Midnite & Desmond Williams collaboration
2008 - Kayamagan

Midnite & Rastar collaboration
2007 - Better World Rasta
2008 - Supplication To H.I.M.
2009 - To Mene
2009 - Ina Now
2011 - Treasure
2011 - The Way
2012 - Children Of Jah
2013 - Children Of Jah Dubs
2014 - Better World Rasta Live Dubs

Midnite & Higher Bound Prod collaboration
2007 - Bless Go Roun
2010 - Ark A Law (Lion I)
2013 - Free Indeed

Midnite & Iaahden Sounds collaboration
2014 - Stand The Test

Midnite & Lustre Kings collaboration
2007 - Infinite Quality
2008 - Infinite Dub

Midnite & Natural Vibes collaboration
2008 - Maschaana

Midnite & Youssoupha Sidibe collaboration
2008 - For All

Midnite & Various artists collaboration
2002 - Weep Not
2008 - New Name
2008 - Gather The Remnant
2009 - Defender Of The Faith
2009 - Kings Of Kush
2009 - Frontline Souljah

References

External links 
 
 Midnite Lyrics at vireggae.com

American reggae musical groups
People from Saint Croix, U.S. Virgin Islands